The Chita Rivera Awards for Dance and Choreography (previously titled the Fred and Adele Astaire Awards) celebrate outstanding dance and choreography in theatre, both on Broadway and Off-Broadway and in film at an annual ceremony in New York City at the Skirball Center for the Performing Arts. Now carrying the namesake of two-time Tony-winning dance icon Chita Rivera, The Rivera Awards will be presented under the auspices of American Dance Machine, an organization dedicated to the preservation of great musical-theater choreography.

The awards
The awards are given for theatre and film productions and performances for each season they fall in. Several discretionary non-competitive awards are also given, including a Lifetime Achievement Award Recipient and an Outstanding Contribution to Musical Theatre and Film award. The awards were named after Fred Astaire and Adele Astaire.
 The awards for Off-Broadway performances and productions were first presented with the 2016 awards.

Now named The Chita Rivera Awards for Dance and Choreography, The Fred and Adele Astaire Awards were established in 1982. It was initially known as simply The Astaire Awards. The award was established with the cooperation of Fred Astaire to honor him and his sister, Adele, who starred with her brother in ten Broadway musicals between 1917 and 1931. The awards previously honored the "best dance on Broadway in the categories of best choreographer, best female dancer and best male dancer."

The first Douglas Watt Lifetime Achievement Award was presented to Tommy Tune in 2008. The awards were expanded to include dance in and choreography for film in 2008.Stanley Donen received the Douglas Watt Lifetime Achievement Award in 2009. Other Douglas Watt Lifetime Achievement Award recipients include Kenny Ortega in 2010, and Jacques D’Amboise in 2011. Liza Minnelli received the Douglas Watt Lifetime Achievement Award for 2012, Marge Champion was the Lifetime Achievement Award recipient in 2013, and Patricia Birch received the award in 2014. Joel Grey received the 2015 Watt Lifetime Achievement Award, as well as film producer Harvey Weinstein (Outstanding Contribution to Musical Theatre & Film). The Douglas Watt Lifetime Achievement Award for 2016 was given to Judith Jamison, and Maurice Hines was given a special recognition award for Outstanding Body of Work in Dance.

On March 30, 2017, it was announced that the Astaire Awards were "rebranded" as the Chita Rivera Awards for Dance and Choreography. The awards will be presented by the American Dance Machine for the 21st Century, with the first awards presented on September 11, 2017 at the Hirschfeld Theatre in New York City. The show was directed by Randy Skinner and hosted by Bebe Neuwirth. Nominations for the Chita Rivera Awards for Dance and Choreography were announced on May 1, 2017, and included the first Lifetime Achievement Award to Tommy Tune and the Award for Outstanding Contribution to Musical Theater as Director to Diane Paulus. The new musical Bandstand received 5 nominations, and the Off-Broadway production of Sweet Charity received 6 nominations. Bandstand won the award for Outstanding Choreography in a Broadway Show and Sweet Charity won the award for Outstanding Choreography In An Off-Broadway Show.

The award nominations for 2018 were presented on May 20, 2018. The Broadway revival of Carousel received the most nominations, with seven. Carmen De Lavallade (Lifetime Achievement Award), John Kander (Outstanding Contribution to Musical Theater Award) and Harold Prince (SDC Director Award for Exemplary Collaboration with Choreographers) received special awards. Steven Hoggett, on Broadway this season with Angels in America and Harry Potter and the Cursed Child, received the inaugural Douglas and Ethel Watt Critics' Choice Award.
Sergio Trujillo, won the award for Outstanding Choreography in a Broadway Show for Summer: The Donna Summer Musical; Zach Morris and Jennine Willet won the award for Outstanding Choreography in an Off-Broadway Show for Ghost Light; the award for Outstanding Ensemble in a Broadway Show was a tie between Carousel and Mean Girls.

References

External links
 Chita Rivera Awards Official Site

American choreography awards
Dance awards
American film awards
American theater awards
Awards established in 1982
1982 establishments in the United States
Fred Astaire